The Russell Microcap Index measures the performance of the microcap segment of the U.S. equity market. It makes up less than 3% of the U.S. equity market. It includes 1,000 of the smallest securities in the Russell 2000 Index based on a combination of their market cap and current index membership and it also includes up to the next 1,000 stocks. , the weighted average market capitalization for a company in the index was $535 million; the median market cap was $228 million. The market cap of the largest company in the index was $3.6 billion.

The index, which was launched on June 1, 2005, is maintained by FTSE Russell, a subsidiary of the London Stock Exchange Group. Its ticker symbol is ^RUMIC.

Records
In February 2021, during the everything bubble, a record 14 members of the index exceeded the market capitalization of the smallest member of the S&P 500 Index.

Investing
The Russell Microcap Index is tracked by the iShares Micro-Cap ETF.

Top 10 holdings
Mercury Systems
Centerstate Banks
Lakeland Financial
Merit Medical Systems
Team Inc
Patrick Industries
Synergy Pharmaceuticals
Hanmi Financial
Aerie Pharmaceuticals
Stewart Information Services
(as of December 31, 2016)

Top sectors by weight
Financial Services
Health Care
Consumer Discretionary
Technology
Producer Durables

See also
Russell Investments
Russell 2000 Index
Russell 1000 Index

References

External links
FTSE Russell Index Fact Sheet
FTSE Russell Indexes
FTSE Russell Investment Group
Index Construction and Methodology
Yahoo! Finance page for ^RUMIC

American stock market indices
Financial services companies established in 1981
1981 establishments in the United States